Rusalevka is a rural locality (a village) in Chaykovsky, Perm Krai, Russia. The population was 267 as of 2010. There are 6 streets.

Geography 
Rusalevka is located 19 km southeast of Chaykovsky. Foki is the nearest rural locality.

References 

Rural localities in Chaykovsky urban okrug